Leucadendron olens, the yellow conebush, is a flower-bearing shrub that belongs to the genus Leucadendron and forms part of the fynbos. The plant is native to the Western Cape, South Africa.

Description
Fire destroys the plant but the seeds survive. The seeds are stored in a toll on the female plant, and when ripe, released and carried by ants to their nests. The plant is unisexual and there are separate plants with male and female flowers, which are pollinated by insects.

Distribution and habitat

The plant occurs in the Doring River Valley and the Grootdoring River of the Outeniqua Mountains, South Africa.

Gallery

References

External links 

olens